Victor David Sjöström (20 September 1879 – 3 January 1960), also known in the United States as Victor Seastrom, was a pioneering Swedish film director, screenwriter, and actor. He began his career in Sweden, before moving to Hollywood in 1924. Sjöström worked primarily in the silent era; his best known films include The Phantom Carriage (1921), He Who Gets Slapped (1924), and The Wind (1928). Sjöström was Sweden's most prominent director in the "Golden Age of Silent Film" in Europe. Later in life, he played the leading role in Ingmar Bergman's Wild Strawberries (1957).

Biography
Born in Årjäng/Silbodal, in the Värmland region of Sweden, he was only a year old when his father, Olof Adolf Sjöström, moved the family to Brooklyn, New York. His mother died in 1886, he was seven years old. Sjöström returned to Sweden where he lived with relatives in Stockholm, beginning his acting career at 17 as a member of a touring theater company.

Drawn from the stage to the fledgling motion picture industry, he made his first film in 1912 under the direction of Mauritz Stiller. Between 1912 and 1923, he directed another forty-one films in Sweden, some of which are now lost. Those surviving include The Sons of Ingmar (1919), Karin, Daughter of Ingmar (1920) and The Phantom Carriage (1921), all based on stories by the Nobel Prize–winning novelist Selma Lagerlöf. Many of his films from the period are marked by subtle character portrayal, fine storytelling and evocative settings in which the Swedish landscape often plays a key psychological role. The naturalistic quality of his films was enhanced by his (then revolutionary) preference for on-location filming, especially in rural and village settings. He is also known as a pioneer of continuity editing in narrative filmmaking.

In 1923, Sjöström accepted an offer from Louis B. Mayer to work in the United States. In Sweden, he had acted in his own films as well as in those for others, but in Hollywood he devoted himself solely to directing. Using an anglicized name, Victor Seastrom, he made the drama film Name the Man (1924) based on the Hall Caine novel, The Master of Man. He directed stars of the day such as Greta Garbo, John Gilbert, Lillian Gish, Lon Chaney, and Norma Shearer in another eight films in America before his first talkie in 1930. His 1926 film The Scarlet Letter, starring Lillian Gish as the adulterous Hester Prynne, allows Hester a certain voluptuousness; when she leaves the bare rooms of the town for a date with her lover in the verdant woods, she defiantly pulls off her scarlet letter A, takes off her cap as well, and we see her beautiful, rich head of hair.

Uncomfortable with the modifications needed to direct sound films, Victor Sjöström returned to Sweden where he directed two more films before his final directing effort, an English-language drama filmed in the United Kingdom Under the Red Robe (1937). Over the following fifteen years, Sjöström returned to acting in the theatre, performed a variety of leading roles in more than a dozen films and was a company director of Svensk Film Industri. Aged 78, he gave his final acting performance, probably his best remembered, as the elderly professor Isak Borg in Ingmar Bergman's film Wild Strawberries (1957).

Personal life 
Sjöström was married three times. His daughter was actress Guje Lagerwall (1918-2019).

Victor Sjöström died in Stockholm at the age of 80, and he was interred in the Norra begravningsplatsen (Northern cemetery).

Filmography

Director 

 Ett hemligt giftermål (1912)
 Trädgårdsmästaren (1912)
 Marriage Bureau (Äktenskapsbyrån) (1913)
 Laughter and Tears (Löjen och tårar) (1913)
 Lady Marion's Summer Flirtation (Lady Marions sommarflirt) (1913)
 The Voice of Passion (Blodets röst) (1913)
 The Conflicts of Life (Livets konflikter) (1913)
 Ingeborg Holm (Margaret Day) (1913)
 Half Breed (Halvblod) (1913)
 The Miracle (Miraklet, Within the Gates) (1913)
 The Poacher (Kärlek starkare än hat eller skogsdotterns hemlighet) (1914)
 The Clergyman (Prästen, Saints and Their Sorrows, The Parson) (1914)
 Judge Not (Dömen icke) (1914)
 The Strike (Strejken) (1914)
 A Good Girl Keeps Herself in Good Order (Bra flicka reder sig själv) (1914)
 Children of the Streets (Gatans barn) (1914)
 Daughter of the Peaks (Högfjällets dotter) (1914)
 Hearts That Meet (Hjärtan som mötas) (1914)
 One of the Many (En av de många) (1915)
 Guilt Redeemed (Sonad skuld) (1915)
 Det var i maj (1915)
 The Governor's Daughters (Landshövdingens döttrar, Det var i maj) (1915)
 Stick to Your Last, Shoemaker (Skomakare, bliv vid din läst) (1915)
 In the Hour of Trial (I prövningens stund) (1915)
 The Price of Betrayal (Judaspengar) (1915)
 The Ships That Meet (Skepp som mötas) (1916)
 The Sea Vultures (Havsgamar, Predators of the Sea) (1916)
 She Triumphs (Hon segrade) (1916)
 Kiss of Death (Dödskyssen) (1916)
 Therèse (1916)
 A Man There Was (Terje Vigen) (1917)
 The Lass from the Stormy Croft (Tösen från Stormyrtorpet, The Girl from the Marsh Croft, The Woman He Chose) (1917)
 The Outlaw and His Wife (Berg-Ejvind och hans hustru, Eyvind of the Hills, Love: The Only Law, You and I) (1918)
 Sons of Ingmar (Ingmarssönerna, Dawn of Love) (1919)
 His Lordship's Last Will (Hans nåds testamente, His Grace's Last Testament, His Grace's Will) (1919)
 The Monastery of Sendomir (Klostret i Sendomir, Secret of the Monastery) (1920)
 Karin Daughter of Ingmar (Karin Ingmarsdotter, God's Way) (1920)
 A Lover in Pawn (Mästerman) (1920)
 The Phantom Carriage (Körkarlen, The Phantom Chariot, The Stroke of Midnight, Thy Soul Shall Bear Witness) (1921)
 Love's Crucible (Vem dömer, Mortal Clay) (1922)
 The Surrounded House (Det omringade huset, The House Surrounded) (1922)
 Fire on Board (Eld ombord, Jealousy, The Hell Ship) (1923)
 Name the Man (1924)
 He Who Gets Slapped (1924)
 Confessions of a Queen (1925)
 The Tower of Lies (1925)
 The Scarlet Letter (1926)
 The Divine Woman (1928)
 The Masks of the Devil (1928)
 The Wind (1928)
 A Lady to Love (1930)
 Father and Son (1930)
  (Markurells i Wadköping, Father and Son, Vater und Sohn) (1931)
 Under the Red Robe (1937)

Actor 

 De svarta maskerna (1912) as Lieutenant von Mühlen
 I lifvets vår (1912) as Cyril Alm
 The Voice of Passion (1913) as Daniel Barkner
 The Conflicts of Life (1913) as Otto Berner
 För sin kärleks skull (1914) as Borgen
 The Strike (1914) as Karl Bernsson / Gustav Bernsson
 Kiss of Death (1916) as Òveringenjör Weyler / Ingenjör Lebel
 Terje Vigen (A Man There Was, 1917) as Terje Vigen
 Thomas Graals bästa barn (Thomas Graal's First Child 1917) as Thomas Graal
 The Outlaw and His Wife (1918) as Outlaw / Kári
 Thomas Graals bästa barn (1918) as Thomas Graal
 Sons of Ingmar (1919) as Lill Ingmar Ingmarsson
 Karin Daughter of Ingmar (1920) as Ingmar
 A Lover in Pawn (1920) as Sammel Eneman
 Körkarlen (The Phantom Carriage, 1921) as David Holm
 Det omringade huset (1922) as Captain Davies
 Eld ombord (1923) as Dick
 Colourful Pages (1931) as Sjöström, director (uncredited)
 Markurells i Wadköping (1931) as Markurell
 Synnöve Solbakken (1934) as Sämund - Sæmund
 Walpurgis Night (1935) as Frederik Bergström, Editor
 John Ericsson, Victor of Hampton Roads (1937) as John Ericsson
 Gubben kommer (1939) as Carl-Henrik de Grévy, 'Gubben'
 Mot nya tider (1939) as Hjalmar Branting
 The Fight Continues (1941) as Andreas Berg
 There's a Fire Burning (1943) as Henrik Falkman
 The Word (1943) as Knut Borg Sr.
 The Emperor of Portugallia (1944) as Jan i Skrolycka
 Rail Workers (1947) as Stora Ballong
 I Am with You (1948) as Vicar
 Dangerous Spring (1949) as P. Bladh, antiques dealer
 Till glädje (To Joy, 1950, directed by Ingmar Bergman) as professor Sönderby
 The Quartet That Split Up (1950) as Gustaf Borg
 The Clang of the Pick (1952) as Klaus Willenhart
 Love (1952) as Bishop
 Men in the Dark (1955) as Gustaf Landberg
 Smultronstället (Wild Strawberries, 1957, directed by Ingmar Bergman) as Dr. Eberhard Isak Borg (final film role)

References

External links

 
 
 Victor Sjöström at Virtual History
 "Victor Sjostrom and Mauritz Stiller" UC Santa Barbara Research Paper (2005) by Maximilian Schmige

1879 births
1960 deaths
People from Årjäng Municipality
Swedish film directors
Swedish male stage actors
Burials at Norra begravningsplatsen
Swedish male silent film actors
20th-century Swedish male actors
Swedish male screenwriters
Swedish male film actors
Cinema pioneers
20th-century Swedish screenwriters
20th-century Swedish male writers
Swedish emigrants to the United States